Laurent Devalle (15 January 1892 – 22 July 1965) was a Monegasque racing cyclist. He rode in the 1921 Tour de France.

References

1892 births
1965 deaths
Monegasque male cyclists
Place of birth missing